Sergio Arturo Bernal Hernández also known as "El Puma Mayor" (The Eldest Puma) (born 9 February 1970) is a Mexican former professional footballer who played as a goalkeeper.

Club career
Bernal played as a goalkeeper for Club Universidad Nacional, a Mexico City team commonly known as the Pumas. He joined the Pumas in 1988 from the UNAM Fuerzas Basicas. He has been champion with Pumas 4 times, in 1991, and was a major part in getting the golden year back to back "bicampeones" in 2004. He was also the team captain. He made his 500th Primera Mexico Division appearance on 21 February 2010. Pumas won the match 1–0 against Atlante FC.

He announced his retirement on 9 December 2010 after 21 years of playing for the UNAM Pumas.

International career
Bernal participated in the 2001 USA Cup under Hugo Sánchez and had been called by Hugo Sánchez to the Mexico National Team twice but he was unable to play on either occasion because of shoulder and knee injuries.

Career statistics

Club
 Fuerzas Básicas del Pumas – (México)
 Pumas – (México)
 Correcaminos UAT – (México)
 Puebla F.C. – (México)

Honours
Pumas
 Campeón de Liga (México): 1990–91
 Campeón Clausura (México): 2004, 2009
 Campeón Apertura (México): 2004

References

External links

1970 births
Living people
Footballers from Mexico City
Association football goalkeepers
Mexico international footballers
Club Universidad Nacional footballers
Club Puebla players
Liga MX players
Medalists at the 1991 Pan American Games
Pan American Games silver medalists for Mexico
Pan American Games medalists in football
Footballers at the 1991 Pan American Games
Mexican footballers